Ben Easton Close (born 8 August 1996) is an English professional footballer who plays as a central midfielder for Doncaster Rovers.

Career

Portsmouth
Born in Portsmouth, Close signed a two-year scholarship deal after spending many years in Portsmouth's youth categories. He was an unused substitute for a first team game on 3 May 2014 for a league game against Plymouth Argyle.

On 9 May 2014, Close was offered a one-year professional contract with the club, alongside Bradley Tarbuck. On 12 September 2014, he made his professional debut, coming on as a 43rd minute substitute for Nigel Atangana in a 3–1 away win against Yeovil Town, for the campaign's Football League Trophy.

Close made his League Two debut on 16 September, again from the bench in a 3–0 home success against Dagenham & Redbridge. After playing only 4 games for Pompey in 2016–17, on 31 January 2017, he joined National League side Eastleigh on loan until the end of the season.

On 26 May 2017 Close signed a new one-year contract at Pompey, with the club holding an option for an additional year. On 17 December, after becoming a starter under new manager Kenny Jackett, he extended his contract until 2020.

On 2 March 2019, Close scored his first professional brace in a 5–1 home victory over Bradford City.

Doncaster Rovers

Close signed for Doncaster Rovers on a three-year deal on 7 June 2021.

Career statistics

Honours
Portsmouth
EFL Trophy: 2018–19; runner-up: 2019–20

References

External links

1996 births
Living people
Footballers from Portsmouth
English footballers
Association football midfielders
Portsmouth F.C. players
Poole Town F.C. players
Eastleigh F.C. players
English Football League players
National League (English football) players
Southern Football League players